This is the list of cathedrals in Thailand.

Roman Catholic
Cathedrals of the Roman Catholic Church in Thailand:
 Cathedral of the Assumption of the Blessed Virgin Mary in Bangkok
 Cathedral of the Immaculate Conception in Chanthaburi
 Sacred Heart Cathedral in Chiang Mai
 Our Lady of Lourdes Cathedral in Nakhon Ratchasima
 St. Anna Cathedral in Nakhon Sawan
 Nativity of Our Lady Cathedral in Amphoe Bang Khonthi
 St. Raphael Cathedral in Surat Thani
 St. Michael the Archangel Cathedral in Tha Rae
 St. Anne's Co-Cathedral in Nakhon Phanom
 Immaculate Conception Cathedral in Ubon Ratchathani
 Cathedral of Our Mother of Perpetual Help in Udon Thani

See also

List of cathedrals
Christianity in Thailand

References

Christianity in Thailand
Thailand

Cathedrals
Cathedrals